Burlington is an incorporated town in Newfoundland and Labrador, Canada. It is a small fishing and lumbering community on Route 413 at the north side of the mouth of Green Bay. Burlington is located approximately 40 km from Baie Verte.

History
Burlington was  once named Northwest Arm, and was permanently settled in the mid-19th century. The community was renamed in the early part of 1915 due to a mix-up in the mail service. After many residents complained that their mail was sent to another community with a similar name, the town leaders felt the need to have a name change. Out of three separate entries, 'Burlington' was chosen.

There was no large industry in the 19th century. The early settlers fished for cod and cleared land to grow potatoes, cabbage and small fruits. Keeping animals provided meat for the winter and milk and butter in season. Settlers built their own boats for fishing in Labrador, or they were employed by the inshore fishery. When mines opened at both Bett's Cove and Tilt Cove, some of the Burlington men went to both communities for work.

Logging pitprops for the United Kingdom were started in 1915 by a contractor named John Jennings. This industry was closed in 1918 when the sale of pitprops ended. Lumber camps opened in 1920, but closed during the Depression of the 1930s. In 1935, the Thistle family started cutting export wood. They remained a major economic force in Burlington for approximately 30 years. Camps later opened for the cutting of pulpwood and continued for about ten years. In 1969 pulpwood was again the main industry, shipped out by truck from Burlington.

Language
According to the 2021 census, 100% of Burlington's population speaks English, with the census also stating that 100% of the population only know how to speak English. Burlington and surrounding area has a distinct dialect that is still heard by many today, because of its English and Irish heritage.

Demographics 

Notable residents
Rex Goudie
Shaun Majumder

Towns and communities nearby
 Middle Arm
 Smith's Harbour
 Baie Verte
 Springdale
 Kings Island

See also
 Baie Verte Peninsula
 List of cities and towns in Newfoundland and Labrador

References

External links

Populated coastal places in Canada
Towns in Newfoundland and Labrador